{{DISPLAYTITLE:C15H11O6}}
The molecular formula C15H11O6 (C15H11O6+, molar mass: 287.24 g/mol, exact mass: 287.0555626 u) may refer to:

 Aurantinidin, an anthocyanidin
 Columnidin, an anthocyanidin
 Cyanidin, an anthocyanidin
 Robinetinidin, an anthocyanidin
 Tricetinidin, an anthocyanidin

Molecular formulas